is a Japanese actress.

Konno is a former member of the Takarazuka Revue. She married her husband, a pilot, in 2008. They have two children.

Filmography

Television
Fūrin Kazan (2007) – Ogoto-hime
Diplomat Kosaku Kuroda (2011) – Tomoyo Shimomura
Our Sister's Soulmate (2020) – Saori Kishimoto
Come Come Everybody (2021)

References

External links
Profile at FLaMe (talent agency; in Japanese)

Japanese actresses
1977 births
Living people
People from Toyonaka, Osaka
Takarazuka Revue